Queen Daemok of the Hwangju Hwangbo clan, also known as Queen Taemok, was a Goryeo princess: she was the only daughter of King Taejo and Queen Sinjeong, and the younger sister of King Daejong. After becoming a queen consort through her marriage with her half older brother King Gwangjong, she gave birth to his successor, King Gyeongjong. She was the first queen of Goryeo to adopt her maternal clan's surname, Hwangbo.

Her date of birth is unknown, but it's usually placed in the early 930s, while her marriage is believed to have taken place between 937 and 943. In 956, when Gwangjong proclaimed the law of slaves' emancipation, she strongly opposed it and begged him earnestly, but Gwangjong ignored and rejected her pleas. Daemok's opposition to the law stemmed from the Hwangbo clan, whose interests she was trying to protect; however, in Gwangjong's eyes, her maternal family was only one of the noble families to be removed.

Her death is presumed to have occurred after 975 but before 1002, when King Mokjong (her only grandson) gave her a posthumous name. She was enshrined in Heolleung tomb along with her husband.

Posthumous name
In April 1002 (5th year reign of King Mokjong), name An-jeong (안정, 安靜) was added. 
In March 1014 (5th year reign of King Hyeonjong), name Seon-myeong (선명, 宣明) was added.
In April 1027 (18th year reign of King Hyeonjong), name Ui-jeong (의정, 懿正) and Sin-gyeong (신경, 信敬) were added.
In October 1056 (10th year reign of King Munjong), name Gong-pyeong (공평, 恭平) was added.
In October 1253 (40th year reign of King Gojong), name Jeong-ye (정예, 靜睿) was added to her posthumous name too.

Family
Father, also as father-in-law: King Taejo of Goryeo (31 January 877 – 7 July 943)
Grandfather: King Sejo of Goryeo (died 897)
Grandmother: Lady Han, Queen Wisuk
Biological mother: Queen Sinjeong (died 19 August 983)
Grandfather: Hwangbo Je-gong
Older brother: Daejong of Goryeo (died 969); married his half-sister, Queen Seonui
Stepmother, also as mother-in-law: Queen Sinmyeong
Husband (formerly half brother): King Gwangjong of Goryeo (925 – 4 July 975)
1st son: King Gyeongjong of Goryeo (9 November 955 – 13 August 981)
2nd son: Prince Hyohwa
1st daughter: Lady Cheonchujeon
Son-in-law: Prince Cheonchujeon
2nd daughter: Lady Bohwa
3rd daughter: Queen Mundeok
Son-in-law: Wang Gyu, prince Hongdeokwon; had a daughter who would become the first wife of King Mokjong
Son-in-law: King Seongjong of Goryeo (15 January 961 – 29 November 997); had no issue

In popular culture
Queen Daemok is often portrayed as an antagonist when the stories are based on Gwangjong's  reign period.
Portrayed by Jun Hye-jin in the 2002–2003 KBS TV series The Dawn of the Empire.
Portrayed by Lee Young-ah in the 2009 KBS2 TV series Empress Cheonchu.
Portrayed by Lee Ha-nui in the 2015 MBC TV series Shine or Go Crazy.
Portrayed by Kang Han-na in the 2016 SBS TV series Moon Lovers: Scarlet Heart Ryeo.

References

External links
Queen Daemok on Encykorea .
Queen Daemok on EToday News .
대목왕후 on Doosan Encyclopedia .

Goryeo princesses
Royal consorts of the Goryeo Dynasty
Korean queens consort
Year of birth unknown
Year of death unknown